Havelock is a city in Craven County, North Carolina, United States. The population was 20,735 at the 2010 census. The city is home to Marine Corps Air Station Cherry Point, the world's largest Marine Corps air station, and home to the 2nd Marine Aircraft Wing.

Havelock is part of the New Bern Metropolitan Statistical Area.

History
Havelock is one of eight cities in the world named after Sir Henry Havelock, a British officer in India, who distinguished himself in 1857 during what was known as the Indian Mutiny. The area was originally named "Havelock Station" in the late 1850s, when the Atlantic and North Carolina Railroad built a depot where its right-of-way crossed what is now Miller Boulevard.

The town was the initial landing point for a Civil War battle known as the Battle of New Bern. On March 11, 1862, Brigadier General Ambrose Burnside's command embarked from Roanoke Island to rendezvous with Union gunboats at Hatteras Inlet for an expedition against New Bern. On March 13, the fleet sailed up the Neuse River, anchored at Slocum Creek, and disembarked infantry on the river's south bank. Elements of the Rhode Island Heavy Artillery came ashore near the present-day location of the Officers' Club on Cherry Point Marine Corps Air Station and also near the Carolina Pines Golf and Country Club. After the capture of New Bern, the Federals transited Havelock on their way to the Battle of Fort Macon. Despite several Confederate attempts to reclaim New Bern and the surrounding area, the Federals did not withdraw until after the end of the war. During one of the attempts, however, the Union-built blockhouse fort on Havelock's Slocom Creek was burned in 1864. A diorama model of the Civil War fort is on exhibit at the Havelock Tourist & Events Center along with other displays of Havelock and Cherry Point history.

Existing records indicate that the production of naval supplies including turpentine and tar were very important in the local economy during the 19th century. With the invention of the steam engine, the demand for tar and turpentine slowly evaporated as fewer wooden ships were constructed. Many distillers of turpentine turned to the production of moonshine to make ends meet.

In 1940, Havelock became the home of Marine Corps Air Station Cherry Point. MCAS Cherry Point's Fleet Readiness Center East employs many residents of the town. In 1959 the town was officially established.

Jimmy Sanders served as the mayor of the city from 1987 until the election of former city commissioner William L. Lewis, Jr. in 2013 by a vote of 624–319.

A park in Havelock is named after Rep. Walter B. Jones, Jr.

In 2017, ex-convict Larry Lawton visited Havelock Middle School as part of the Drug Abuse Resistance Education program to explain the dangers of drug use and the consequences of a criminal life.

Media 
Havelock News is a newspaper based in Havelock, North Carolina. On June 1, 2012, Freedom Communications announced the sale of Havelock News and other newspapers in Freedom's Eastern North Carolina operating group to Halifax Media Group of Daytona Beach, Florida.

Geography
Havelock is located in southern Craven County at  (34.882736, -76.909230). The city limits encompass most of Marine Corps Air Station Cherry Point and extend as far north as the tidal Neuse River. Slocum Creek is a tidal inlet that extends south from the Neuse as far as the center of Havelock.

Demographics

2020 census

As of the 2020 United States census, there were 16,621 people, 6,187 households, and 4,553 families residing in the city.

2010 census
At the 2010 United States Census there were 20,735 people, 6,409 households, and 5,073 families living in the city. The racial makeup of the city was 70.0% White (64.0% Non-Hispanic White), 0.7% Native American, 17.4% African American, 2.9% Asian, 0.3% Native Hawaiian and Other Pacific Islander, 4.0% from other races, and 4.7% from two or more races. Hispanic or Latino of any race were 11.6% of the population.

2000 census
As of the census of 2000, there were 22,442 people, 6,411 households, and 5,276 families living in the city. The population density was 1,342.9 people per square mile (518.5/km2). There were 6,783 housing units at an average density of 405.9/sq mi (156.7/km2). The racial makeup of the city was 70.48% White, 18.53% African American, 0.78% Native American, 2.54% Asian, 0.15% Pacific Islander, 3.94% from other races, and 3.58% from two or more races. Hispanic or Latino of any race were 9.01% of the population.

There were 6,411 households, out of which 52.5% had children under the age of 18 living with them, 69.3% were married couples living together, 10.0% had a female householder with no husband present, and 17.7% were non-families. 13.7% of all households were made up of individuals, and 2.5% had someone living alone who was 65 years of age or older. The average household size was 2.91 and the average family size was 3.19.

In the city, the population was spread out, with 28.2% under the age of 18, 29.0% from 18 to 24, 30.2% from 25 to 44, 9.6% from 45 to 64, and 3.1% who were 65 years of age or older. The median age was 23 years. For every 100 females, there were 133.9 males. For every 100 females age 18 and over, there were 147.2 males.

The median income for a household in the city was $35,351, and the median income for a family was $37,000. Males had a median income of $22,048 versus $18,322 for females. The per capita income for the city was $15,586. About 6.8% of families and 8.6% of the population were below the poverty line, including 12.0% of those under age 18 and 8.3% of those age 65 or over.

Highways
Havelock's main highway is U.S. 70, which runs west to east through the center of town. There is also N.C. 101 (Fontana Boulevard) from which two entrances to Marine Corps Air Station Cherry Point are located. A U.S. 70 bypass around the city is scheduled to begin construction in winter 2017.

Building on a landfill
The city of Havelock began building out in the 1960s and 1970s. Some homes in the town were built over a landfill in the 1970s, which land at that time was still owned by Craven County and not by Havelock. It appears that the old landfill was last used in the 1940s and 1950s. However, many houses appear to be sinking.

The North Carolina Division of Waste Management said in a statement, "We are investigating the site to determine the nature and extent of the waste and any health risks due to the presence of metals on-site. Through preliminary soil testing, we have determined the presence of metals in the soils, but those levels are not considered to be an immediate health risk to people living in the community."

Education

College
 Craven Community College

High school
 Havelock High School
 Early College EAST High School

Middle schools
 Havelock Middle School
 Tucker Creek Middle School

Elementary schools
 Havelock Elementary School
 Arthur W. Edwards Elementary School (Formally known as West Havelock Elementary) 
 Graham A. Barden Elementary School
 Roger R. Bell Elementary School
 W. Jesse Gurganus Elementary School

Private schools
 Gramercy
Annunciation Catholic School (1956)

Notable people
 Kristin Armstrong, three-time Olympic gold medalist in women's road cycling
 Ky Bowman, professional basketball player for the Golden State Warriors
 Bruce Carter, NFL linebacker
 Pharoh Cooper, NFL wide receiver and kick returner
 William M. Faulkner, United States Marine Corps Lieutenant General
 Vince McMahon, CEO of World Wrestling Entertainment (WWE)
 Dennis Mitchell, Olympic track and field athlete
 Corey Robinson, NFL offensive tackle
 William L. Wainwright, former member of the North Carolina General Assembly
 Guy Whimper, NFL offensive guard and Super Bowl champion with Pittsburgh Steelers

References

External links
 City of Havelock official website
 Havelock Chamber of Commerce
 Cherry Point Marine Corps Air Station
 Havelock News
 Havelock History website

Cities in North Carolina
Cities in Craven County, North Carolina
New Bern micropolitan area